In mathematics, Brown–Peterson cohomology is a generalized cohomology theory introduced by
, depending on a choice of prime p.
Its representing spectrum is  denoted by BP.

Complex cobordism and Quillen's idempotent

Brown–Peterson cohomology BP is a summand of MU(p), which is complex cobordism MU localized at a prime p. In fact MU(p) is a wedge product of suspensions of BP.

For each prime p, Daniel Quillen showed there is a unique idempotent map of ring spectra ε from MUQ(p) to itself, with the property that ε([CPn]) is [CPn] if n+1 is a power of p, and 0 otherwise. The spectrum BP is the image of this idempotent ε.

Structure of BP

The cohomology of the Hopf algebroid  is the initial term of the Adams–Novikov spectral sequence for calculating p-local homotopy groups of spheres.

BP is the universal example of a complex oriented cohomology theory whose associated formal group law is p-typical.

See also
List of cohomology theories#Brown–Peterson cohomology

References

. 
.
 

Cohomology theories